Mephritus is a genus of beetles in the family Cerambycidae, containing the following species:

 Mephritus adelphus (Martins, 1973)
 Mephritus amictus (Newman, 1841)
 Mephritus apicatus (Linsley, 1935)
 Mephritus apicepullus Galileo & Martins, 2011
 Mephritus auricolle Tavakilian & Martins, 1991
 Mephritus blandus (Newman, 1841)
Mephritus bonasoi Galileo, Martins & Santos-Silva, 2014
 Mephritus callidioides (Bates, 1870)
 Mephritus castaneus Martins & Napp, 1992
 Mephritus citreus Napp & Martins, 1982
Mephritus costae Garcia & Nascimento, 2020
 Mephritus destitutus Napp & Martins, 1982
Mephritus eleandroi Galileo, Martins & Santos-Silva, 2014
 Mephritus estoni Galileo & Martins, 2011
 Mephritus flavipes (Gounelle, 1909)
 Mephritus fraterculus Martins & Napp, 1992
 Mephritus genuinus Napp & Martins, 1982
 Mephritus guttatus Napp & Martins, 1982
Mephritus hovorei Santos-Silva & Lingafelter, 2021
Mephritus meyeri Galileo, Martins & Santos-Silva, 2014
Mephritus punctulatus Galileo, Martins & Santos-Silva, 2014
 Mephritus quadrimaculatus Martins & Napp, 1992
 Mephritus serius (Newman, 1841)
 Mephritus vescus Galileo & Martins, 2011

References

Elaphidiini